Aghasi Khan (1731–88) (Azerbaijani: اغاسی خان) was second Khan of Shirvan Khanate along with his brother Muhammad Said Khan. He was of nomadic tribe of Khanchobani.

Early life and reign 
He was born to strong noble Askar bey  or Allahverdi bey  and his wife Ummugulsum khanum. His parents were of Sarkar clan of Khanchobani. In 1763/5 he attacked  with his brother Muhammad Said khan to depose Hajji Muhammad Ali Khan by support of nomadic nobles. They captured New Shemakhy and moved capital to Old Shamakhy. But soon, in 1768 Fatali Khan of Quba attacked with his ally Shaki Khanate. In order to start negotiation, Muhammad Said khan himself went to Fatali Khan's court and Aghasi khan headed to Shaki. Aghasi khan was blinded by Huseyn khan of Shaki while his brother imprisoned. Khanate divided by Shaki Khanate and Quba Khanate. Khanate passed to Manaf Zarnavai and Fatali Khan's brother Abdulla. Next year Fatali Khan fully invaded Shirvan.

Struggle for throne 
Between 1768 and 1774, House of Sarkar were negotiating with Karabakh Khanate and Gilan Khanate in order to achieve reindependence. Fatali khan was defeated in 1774 with combined forces of Shaki Khanate, Avar Khanate, Kaitag and retreated to Salyan. Prior to this event Aghasi khan with his brother, declared himself independent again. They were defeated again by Fatali Khan. Aghasi khan was imprisoned, taken to Baku and was executed there.

Family 
Aghasi khan were married to 4 wives and had 12 children:
 Bibikhanum khanum – (m. 1756):
 Mostafa Khan – Last khan of Shirvan
 Ismail bey Sarkar (1760–1848)-Mostafa died in the same place as Khan, was buried in the Baba Samid cemetery.
 Kafiye khanum – (b. 1766) married with Qasim Khan .
 Balash khanum – (b. 1769)
 Khadija khanum – (b. 1776)
 Khadija khanum (m. 1760 – d. 1774):
 Khayrunnisa khanum – (b. 1761)
 Khadijakhanum khanum – (m. 1771 – d. 1783)-She was buried in the Baba Samid cemetery.
 Hashim bey (1773–1845)-He was buried in the Baba Samid cemetery.
 Jafar bey (1776–1827)-He was buried in the Baba Samid cemetery.
 Abdulla bey (1778–1842)-He was buried in the Baba Samid cemetery.
 Mehdi bey (1780–1827)-He was buried in the Baba Samid cemetery.
 Hajar khanum – (b. 1783).
 Abida khanum – (m. 1776 – d.1805):
 Seadet khanum – (b. 1778).

References 

Khans
18th century in Azerbaijan
Shirvan Khanate
1731 births
1788 deaths